Classroom is a Bengali romantic drama movie which is directed by Rajiv Kumar Biswas.

It starred Kaushik Sen and Kharaj Mukherjee, Sohail Dutta, Kuyasha Biswas, Rudranil Ghosh, Supriyo Dutta. It was released on 13 July 2018.

Cast
 Sohail Dutta
 Kuyasha Biswas
Arya Dasgupta
 Koushik Sen
 Kharaj Mukherjee
 Rudranil Ghosh
 Supriyo Dutta

References

External links

Indian romantic drama films
2018 films
Bengali-language Indian films
2010s Bengali-language films
Films directed by Rajiv Kumar Biswas